Luo Meizhen (9 July 1885? – 4 June 2013) was a Chinese claimant for the world's oldest person. Her claim was supported by a report from the Gerontological Society of China (GSC). However, it has not gained widespread acceptance due to the lack of reliable birth records in Guangxi at the time of her birth.

Life and family
Luo Meizhen's official identity documents claimed that she was born in Guangxi on 9 July 1885. However, these documents were issued later in life. Her birth date could not be authoritatively verified as birth records were not kept in the region until 1949.

She was from the Yao ethnic group and lived in Bama county. Bama is known for the longevity of many of its residents, recording 31.7 supercentenarians per 100,000 people at their 2011 census. Luo was illiterate and worked as a farmer and housewife throughout her life. She was described as a nice but stubborn woman with a strong character.

Luo had five children. Skeptics of her longevity claim pointed out that if her date of birth was as claimed, she would have given birth to her youngest son at the old age of 61.

Oldest person claim 
In 2010, the Gerontological Society of China announced that 125-year-old Luo Meizhen was the oldest living person in China. This also made her a likely claimant to be the oldest living person in the world. However, the lack of official birth records meant that Guinness World Records was unable to accept the claim of longevity.

Death 
After a few months of illness, Luo died of natural causes at the claimed age of 127 on 4 June 2013. She had several great-great-grandchildren by the time of her death.

References

2013 deaths
Longevity claims
Year of birth uncertain
Qing dynasty people
People of the Republic of China
People from Baise